This is a list of players who played at least one game for the Winnipeg Jets of the National Hockey League (NHL) (1979–1996). For a list of players who played for the Jets in the World Hockey Association, see List of Winnipeg Jets (WHA) players.



Key
  Current Team player.
  Hockey Hall of Famer

The "Seasons" column lists the first year of the season of the player's first game and the last year of the season of the player's last game. For example, a player who played one game in the 2000–2001 season would be listed as playing with the team from 2000–2001, regardless of what calendar year the game occurred within.

Skaters

Goaltenders

See also
List of NHL players

References
NHL Jets on hockeydb.com

Winnipeg Jets

players